Swinbrook and Widford is a civil parish in West Oxfordshire formed in 1932. It comprises the village of Swinbrook and the hamlet of Widford. The 2001 census recorded its population as 139.

References

External links

West Oxfordshire District
Civil parishes in Oxfordshire